The Defence of the Magazine at Delhi was an action during the Indian Mutiny on 11 May 1857.

The Defence 
The Indian mutiny began in the Garrison town of Meerut in early May 1857, and the rampaging mutineers reached Delhi on the morning of 10 May, intent on capturing the great magazine and the vast amount of warlike stores. On 11 May Deputy Assistant Commissary John Buckley, Lieutenants Forrest, Willoughby and Raynor, Conductors Shaw and Scully, plus 3 others of the Bengal Ordnance Department defended the Magazine for more than five hours against thousands of rebels. After the mutineers had stormed the Palace, the gates of the Magazine were closed and barricaded. Inside the gates were placed 6 pounder Cannon, double charged with grape. For the further defence of the Gate and the Magazine, there was a 24 pounder Howitzer, which could be aimed at any part of the Magazine, which was operated by Buckley. The native Garrison was then armed, but it was clear that they too were on the verge of mutiny as the men refused to obey any orders issued by Europeans.

The 9 Europeans decided to defend the Magazine for as long as possible in the hope that relief would come from Meerut, then, if all was lost, to blow up the Magazine and themselves, rather than allow the rebels to seize an Army’s worth of munitions. A train of gunpowder was laid by Buckley and Scully, ready to be fired on a pre—arranged signal, which was that of Buckley raising his hat from his head, on the order given by Willoughby. The gunpowder was to be fired by Scully, but not until the last round from the howitzer had been fired. When the mutineers placed scaling ladders against the wall the whole of the native establishment deserted by climbing up the sloped roofs on the inside of the Magazine and descending the ladders to the outside, after which the enemy appeared in great numbers on the top of the walls. The defenders kept up an incessant fire of grape on them, but it was clear that all was lost.

Seeing that the situation was hopeless, Buckley and his comrades took the decision to blow up the arsenal, and consequently themselves, to save the vast quantities of arms and ammunition from falling into rebel hands. On being directed by the severely wounded Lt Willoughby, Conductor Buckley raised his hat as the signal and Conductor Scully took a lighted fuse into the Magazine causing it to ignite. The resulting explosion was the largest ever known and was heard 40 miles away in Meerut. The Magazine simply disintegrated and around a thousand mutineers were killed in the devastating blast.

The Aftermath 
Conductors Shaw and Scully, Sub- Conductor Crow, Sergeants Edwards and Stewart were all killed in the blast. A friendly native guided Lieutenant Raynor to safety. Rebels killed Lieutenant Willoughby some two days later whilst he was trying to reach Meerut. Lieutenant Forrest, who was also wounded, reached Meerut after much hardship. In the smoke and confusion Buckley, although severely wounded and blasted almost black by gunpowder, had initially managed to escape the rebels as he was blown clear over the walls and into the River Jumna. He came under heavy rifle fire and he was hit in the elbow. Being already wounded and near exhaustion he collapsed on the far bank and was captured. On learning that his wife and 3 children had been mercilessly slaughtered in the city he broke down, being so distressed that he wanted to die himself and tried to provoke his captors to kill him. However, the rebel leaders had been so impressed with the gallant actions of the defenders in the Magazine that they refused to kill such a brave man. After some weeks he was able to escape and made a safe passage to British lines.

References

Battles of the Indian Rebellion of 1857